Cape Bowles is a cape forming the southern extremity of Clarence Island in the South Shetland Islands of Antarctica. It was named in 1820 by Edward Bransfield, Master, Royal Navy, while exploring the islands in the brig Williams.

Important Bird Area
The site has been identified as an Important Bird Area (IBA) by BirdLife International because it supports a very large breeding colony of over 100,000 pairs of chinstrap penguins.

References

 

Bowles
Important Bird Areas of Antarctica
Penguin colonies